"Blow the Whistle" is the first single from Oakland rapper Too Short's 16th album of the same name. It was produced by Lil Jon. The song features a refrain of the words "blow the whistle", followed by a series of whistle blasts. It is considered his signature song and is his most popular song as a solo artist as of 2022.

Sampling
Canadian rapper Drake sampled the beat and paid homage to the intro lyrics on DJ Khaled's hit single "For Free". American rapper  and fellow Bay Area native Saweetie sampled the beat on her 2020 single "Tap In". Too Short gave her his blessing to use the sample.

Usage in media
During the 2008 NBA Playoff series between the Cleveland Cavaliers and the Washington Wizards, Jay-Z made a freestyle to this called "Playoff", responding to negative comments by DeShawn Stevenson on behalf of LeBron James. It was also featured on the soundtrack of NBA 2K13. The song is considered a staple for American strip clubs.

The song has been featured on the HBO shows Entourage, Euphoria, and Insecure.

Charts

References

2006 singles
2005 songs
Too Short songs
Song recordings produced by Lil Jon
Songs written by Too Short
Jive Records singles